British rock band Coldplay have headlined eight concert tours and numerous promotional shows, music festivals and other live performances. They are considered one of the most prolific live acts from the United Kingdom, with Asia, Europe, North America and Oceania being visited in all of their concert runs, while Parachutes Tour (2000–01) and Ghost Stories Tour (2014) marked the only instances when a Latin American date was not scheduled. The only shows held in Africa so far happened prior to the Mylo Xyloto Tour (2011–12), at Cape Town's namesake stadium and Johannesburg's FNB Stadium.

Since their debut performance at The Laurel Tree in Camden, London, Coldplay have expanded to theaters and scaled-down arenas on A Rush of Blood to the Head Tour (2002–03); arenas and amphitheaters on Twisted Logic Tour (2005–07); and the first few stadium runs on Viva la Vida Tour (2008–10). According to Pollstar, the band grossed $142.9 million from 2.6 million tickets in North America during the 2000s decade. To promote Mylo Xyloto (2011), they participated in festivals like Austin City Limits, Glastonbury, Lollapalooza, and Rock in Rio, then embarked on a solo tour which was scheduled to end in early 2013, but ultimately got cut short due to unknown circumstances. In 2014, Ghost Stories marked a return to smaller venues, since the record was envisioned as a more "intimate" and "immersive" project.

Conversely, the A Head Full of Dreams Tour (2016–17) saw Coldplay perform solely on stadiums in all countries except the United States, which also included arenas. It currently ranks as the seventh-highest-grossing tour of all time, with $523 million earned from 5.23 million tickets sold in 114 reported dates. In February 2016, the band played at the Super Bowl 50 halftime show and achieved the biggest audience of all time a group and male act. Months later, they became Glastonbury headliners for a fourth time, the most in history for any artist. Released in late 2019, Everyday Life was not marketed with a tour due to environmental concerns. The band instead chose to hold small charity shows (including one at the Natural History Museum), and partnered with YouTube to broadcast a special live event from the Amman Citadel, in Jordan.

In 2022, Coldplay embarked on the Music of the Spheres World Tour, which included a detailed 12 steps plan developed by environmental experts and set out how the band would reduce carbon dioxide emissions by 50% compared to their previous concert run. This led them to be credited with "redefining the rulebook" for eco-friendly touring, while Live Nation's sustainability director Lucy August-Perna stated the company will be working to adopt their plans and best practices. Frederic Opsomer from PRG Projects commented his partnership with the band for the tour resulted in new LED stage products that are set to become the standard in the live entertainment industry. Additionally, they are credited with popularizing the use of interactive LED wristbands in live performances. Acts who followed their trend include Lady Gaga, Taylor Swift, OneRepublic, the Weeknd, and Jay-Z. Grossing over $1 billion from 12 million admissions in 456 reported dates, Coldplay are one of the highest-grossing live music artists.

Concert tours

Promotional concerts

Music festivals

Television shows and specials

Award shows

Radio shows and specials

Other live performances

Early years

Bellatrix/Coldplay Tour

NME Premier Tour

Terris/Coldplay Tour

Showbiz Tour

March 2000–present

See also
 List of highest-grossing live music artists
 List of highest-grossing concert tours

Notes

References

External links
 Coldplay Official Website
 Coldplay on AllMusic

Coldplay concert tours
Lists of concert tours
Lists of concerts and performances